The  2013 United States Open Championship was the 113th U.S. Open, held June 13–16 at the East Course of Merion Golf Club in Ardmore, Pennsylvania, west of Philadelphia.  Justin Rose won his first major title, two strokes ahead of runners-up Jason Day and Phil Mickelson.

Rose became the first player from England to win the U.S. Open since Tony Jacklin in 1970, and the first to win any major since Nick Faldo won his third Masters in 1996.  It was a record sixth runner-up finish for Mickelson and defending champion Webb Simpson tied for 32nd place.  Inclement weather in the opening round delayed the completion of each of the first two rounds to the following day, and the average score in each of the four rounds exceeded 74 (+4).  Shawn Stefani recorded the first-ever hole in one during a U.S. Open at Merion, acing the  17th on Sunday.

Venue
The 2013 U.S. Open was the fifth Open played at Merion's East Course, which opened in 1912.  The past Open champions on the course were Olin Dutra in 1934, Ben Hogan in 1950, Lee Trevino in 1971, and David Graham in 1981.  The course has also hosted the U.S. Amateur six times.

Field
About half the field consisted of players who are exempt from qualifying for the U.S. Open. Each player is classified according to the first category in which he qualified, and other categories are shown in parentheses.

1. Winners of the U.S. Open Championship the last ten years
Ángel Cabrera (5,13,14), Michael Campbell, Jim Furyk (11,12,13,14), Lucas Glover, Graeme McDowell (11,13,14), Rory McIlroy (7,12,13,14), Geoff Ogilvy, Webb Simpson (11,12,13,14), Tiger Woods (8,12,13,14)
Retief Goosen (11) did not play due to a back injury.

2. Winner and runner-up of the 2012 U.S. Amateur Championship
Steven Fox (a), Michael Weaver (a)

3. Winner of the 2012 Amateur Championship
Alan Dunbar turned professional in April 2013, forfeiting his exemption.

4. Winner of the 2012 Mark H. McCormack Medal (Men's World Amateur Golf Rankings)
Chris Williams (a)

5. Winners of the Masters Tournament during the last five years
Phil Mickelson (12,13,14), Charl Schwartzel (13,14), Adam Scott (12,13,14), Bubba Watson (12,13,14)

6. Winners of The Open Championship during the last five years
Stewart Cink, Darren Clarke, Ernie Els (11,12,13,14), Pádraig Harrington (7,11), Louis Oosthuizen (12,13,14)

7. Winners of the PGA Championship the last five years
Keegan Bradley (12,13,14), Martin Kaymer (13,14), Yang Yong-eun

8. Winners of The Players Championship during the last three years
K. J. Choi, Matt Kuchar (12,13,14)

9. Winner of the 2013 European Tour BMW PGA Championship
Matteo Manassero (13,14)

10. Winner of the 2012 U.S. Senior Open Championship
Roger Chapman withdrew due to a shoulder injury.

11. The 10 lowest scorers and anyone tying for 10th place at the 2012 U.S. Open Championship
Kevin Chappell, Jason Dufner (12,13,14), John Peterson, John Senden (12), Michael Thompson (13,14), David Toms, Lee Westwood (12,13,14), Casey Wittenberg

12. Players who qualified for the season-ending 2012 Tour Championship
Luke Donald (13,14), Rickie Fowler (13,14), Sergio García (13,14), Robert Garrigus (13,14), John Huh, Dustin Johnson (13,14), Zach Johnson (13,14), Hunter Mahan (13,14), Ryan Moore (13,14), Carl Pettersson (13,14), Scott Piercy (13,14), Justin Rose (13,14), Brandt Snedeker (13,14), Steve Stricker (13,14), Bo Van Pelt (13,14), Nick Watney (13,14)

13. The top 60 point leaders and ties as of May 27, 2013 in the World Rankings
Tim Clark (14), George Coetzee (14), Nicolas Colsaerts (14), Jason Day (14), Jamie Donaldson (14), Gonzalo Fernández-Castaño (14), Branden Grace (14), Bill Haas (14), Peter Hanson (14), Russell Henley (14), Billy Horschel (14), Freddie Jacobson (14), Martin Laird (14), Paul Lawrie (14), Marc Leishman, Francesco Molinari (14), Thorbjørn Olesen (14), D. A. Points (14), Ian Poulter (14), Marcel Siem (14), Henrik Stenson (14), Kevin Streelman (14), Thongchai Jaidee (14), Boo Weekley (14)
David Lynn (14) and Richard Sterne (14) opted not to compete.

14. The top 60 point leaders and ties as of June 10, 2013 in the World Rankings
Kyle Stanley

15. Special exemptions selected by the USGA
None

The remaining contestants earned their places through sectional qualifiers.
Japan: Hiroyuki Fujita, Hwang Jung-gon, Hideki Matsuyama, Yoshinobu Tsukada, Yui Ueda
England: Paul Casey, Chris Doak, Marcus Fraser, Estanislao Goya, Peter Hedblom, David Howell, Simon Khan, Morten Ørum Madsen, José María Olazábal, John Parry, Eddie Pepperell, Jaco van Zyl
United States
Newport Beach, California: Steven Alker, Max Homa (a), Kim Bi-o, Cory McElyea (a,L), Roger Tambellini (L)
Bradenton, Florida: John Hahn (L), John Nieporte (L), Kevin Phelan (a)
Ball Ground, Georgia: Michael Kim (a), Grayson Murray (a,L), Ryan Nelson (L)
Rockville, Maryland: Matt Bettencourt, Mathew Goggin, Adam Hadwin, Matt Harmon (L), Randall Hutchison (L), Russell Knox, Cliff Kresge, Ryan Sullivan (L)
St. Louis, Missouri: Jay Don Blake, Mackenzie Hughes (L)
Purchase, New York: Gavin Hall (a,L), Jim Herman, Geoffrey Sisk (L), Jesse Smith (L)
Columbus, Ohio: Aaron Baddeley, Bae Sang-moon, Luke Guthrie, David Hearn, Justin Hicks, Charley Hoffman, Brandt Jobe (L), Robert Karlsson, Doug LaBelle II, David Lingmerth, Ted Potter Jr., Rory Sabbatini, Brendan Steele, Josh Teater, Nicholas Thompson
Springfield, Ohio: Brandon Brown, Brian Stuard
Memphis, Tennessee: Brandon Crick (L), Morgan Hoffmann, Jerry Kelly, Scott Langley, Joe Ogilvie, Alistair Presnell, Shawn Stefani, Kevin Sutherland, Andrew Svoboda
Dallas, Texas: Zack Fischer (L), Edward Loar, Jordan Spieth, Matt Weibring
Cle Elum, Washington: Wil Collins, Pan Cheng-tsung (a)

Six alternates were also selected from sectional qualifiers.
Scott Stallings (Memphis) – replaced Roger Chapman
Mike Weir (Columbus) – claimed spot held for category 14
Harold Varner III (L, Rockville) – claimed spot held for category 14
Ryan Palmer (Dallas) – claimed spot held for category 14
Ryan Yip (L, Springfield) – claimed spot held for category 14
Rikard Karlberg (England) – claimed spot held for category 14

(a) denotes amateur
(L) denotes player advanced through local qualifying

For 28 players, the U.S. Open was their first major appearance.
Brandon Brown, Brandon Crick, Chris Doak, Zack Fischer, Luke Guthrie, John Hahn, Gavin Hall, Matt Harmon, Max Homa, Mackenzie Hughes, Randall Hutchison, Kim Bi-o, Michael Kim, Russell Knox, David Lingmerth, Cory McElyea, Grayson Murray, John Nieporte, John Parry, Eddie Pepperell, Jesse Smith, Brian Stuard, Ryan Sullivan, Jaco van Zyl, Yui Ueda, Harold Varner III, Matt Weibring, and Ryan Yip.

Past champions in the field
The field included ten previous champions, half of whom made the cut.

Made the cut

Missed the cut

Retief Goosen (2001, 2004) did not enter

Nationalities in the field

Course layout

East Course

Source:

Lengths of the course for U.S. Opens:

2013: , par 70
1981: , par 70
1971: , par 70
1950: , par 70
1934: , par 70
The course was re-measured prior to the 1971 Open and found to be 150 yds shorter than previously thought. Given that the same tees were used, the previous two opens were also played over 6544 yds as the previous measurement of 6694 was incorrect.

One unique aspect of the course was that players began the first and second rounds on the 1st and 11th tees, rather than the 1st and 10th tees, as is typical. This was due to the 11th tee being more conveniently located relative to the practice range than the 10th tee. This was the second straight year the players did not begin rounds on the 10th tee as the first and second rounds started on the 1st and 9th tee the previous year at Olympic Club.

Round summaries

First round
Thursday, June 13, 2013
Friday, June 14, 2013

Due to rain delays, the first round was not completed on Thursday; only the morning half of the field completed their rounds. Luke Donald was the overnight leader at −4, while Mickelson was the clubhouse leader at 67 (−3). When the first round was completed Friday morning, only five players were under par: Mickelson at 67 (−3), Donald and Mathew Goggin at 68 (−2) and Nicolas Colsaerts and Russell Knox at 69 (−1). Since 2008, the USGA has placed the top three players in the world rankings in the same grouping for the first two rounds. None of the three broke par in the first round: Tiger Woods and Rory McIlroy shot 73 (+3) and Adam Scott 72 (+2). The scoring average for the field was 74.31, more than four strokes over par.

Second round
Friday, June 14, 2013
Saturday, June 15, 2013

On Friday, the second round was suspended due to darkness, with 68 players yet to complete their rounds. The leaders in the clubhouse were Mickelson and Billy Horschel, at 139 (−1). Horschel hit all 18 greens in regulation and shot a 67 (−3). When the second round was completed Saturday morning, Horschel and Mickelson still stood atop the leader board. Only six players shot under-par rounds, led by Horschel's 67. The scoring average for the second round was 75.13.

Amateurs:  Kim (+3), Pan (+4), Weaver (+8), Phelan (+8), Williams (+9), Fox (+10), Hall (+11), Homa (+11), McElyea (+20), Murray (+24)

Third round
Saturday, June 15, 2013

Mickelson shot an even-par round for 209 (−1) to stay atop the leaderboard, his second 54-hole lead at the U.S. Open.  Hunter Mahan, Charl Schwartzel, and Steve Stricker were one shot back at even-par 210. As in the second round, only six players had under-par rounds, led by Rickie Fowler at 67. Woods struggled with his putting; after a birdie on the par-4 1st, he made seven bogeys to shoot 76 and fall to 219 (+9), ten strokes back. The scoring average for the third round was 74.36.

Final round
Sunday, June 16, 2013

Phil Mickelson three-putted the third and fifth holes for double bogeys, but took back the lead with an eagle on the 10th.  Justin Rose responded with birdies on the 12th and 13th.  A bogey by Mickelson on the 13th gave Rose the lead.

Through 16 holes, Rose had five birdies and five bogeys and a one-shot lead over Mickelson.  He managed par on the challenging final two holes, finishing with an even-par 70 for a 281 (+1) overall.  Mickelson narrowly missed a birdie putt on the 16th that would have tied Rose and did not threaten to birdie either of the final two holes.  A missed long par putt on 18 dropped him to +3 overall and into a tie with Jason Day for second place.

For Rose, it was his first major title. He completed the tournament without any double bogeys.  On his win, Rose commented "It feels fantastic. I committed myself to the process this week. I committed myself to putting a strategy in place that I hoped would work in five-to-10 years in delivering major championships ... it's a moment where you can look back and think childhood dreams have come true."  He was the first English player to win the U.S. Open since Tony Jacklin in 1970, and the first to win any major since Nick Faldo won the 1996 Masters.  Rose, who entered the tournament ranked fifth in the world, moved up to third as a result of the win.

For Mickelson, it was his sixth runner-up finish at the U.S. Open, an event record. He has never won the event and called the loss heartbreaking: "this is tough to swallow after coming so close ... I felt like this was as good an opportunity I could ask for and to not get it ... it hurts."

Mahan was tied for the lead as late as the 14th hole before going +4 on the last four holes and dropping into a four-way tie for fourth, four strokes back.  Jason Dufner shot a 67 (−3) despite a triple-bogey on 15 to tie Mahan, Horschel, and Ernie Els.  Hideki Matsuyama also shot a 67 with six birdies to finish in a tie for tenth.  Schwartzel started the day one shot back, but a 78 dropped him outside the top 10.

Shawn Stefani recorded the first-ever hole-in-one during a U.S. Open at Merion, acing the  17th. His 4-iron tee shot bounced off the slope left of the green and rolled a considerable distance into the cup. The scoring average for the fourth round was 74.05.

Final leaderboard

Scorecard
Final round

Cumulative tournament scores, relative to par

Source:

References

External links
 – 2013 U.S. Open
United States Golf Association
Coverage on the PGA Tour's official site
Coverage on the European Tour's official site
Coverage on the PGA of America's official site
Coverage on Philly.com

U.S. Open (golf)
Golf in Pennsylvania
U.S. Open
U.S. Open (golf)
U.S. Open (golf)
U.S. Open (golf)